Altantsetsegiin Battsetseg (born 6 August 1994) is a Mongolian freestyle wrestler. In 2018, she won one of the bronze medals in the women's 57 kg event at the 2018 Asian Games held in Jakarta and Palembang, Indonesia.

In 2020, she won the silver medal in the 59 kg event at the 2020 Asian Wrestling Championships in New Delhi, India.

Major results

References

External links 
 

Living people
1994 births
Place of birth missing (living people)
Mongolian female sport wrestlers
Wrestlers at the 2018 Asian Games
Asian Games medalists in wrestling
Asian Games bronze medalists for Mongolia
Medalists at the 2018 Asian Games
Asian Wrestling Championships medalists
21st-century Mongolian women